Jahn Dennis Storhøi (born July 15, 1960 in Fredrikstad, Norway) is a Norwegian actor.

Biography
He is an acclaimed theatre actor in Norway, having won several awards. However, he is known for his role as Herger the Joyous in John McTiernan's The 13th Warrior. To younger crowds he is better known for playing in several Norwegian TV shows and giving voices to cartoons.

On 17 March 2010, he and several other Norwegian actors were cast in The Thing prequel. The film is supposedly going to be about the Norwegian expedition who found the alien creature. Storhøi later dropped out of the project due to personal reasons and was replaced by Ulrich Thomsen.

Storhøi had one of the leading roles in the 2015 TV mini-series The Heavy Water War.

Personal life
He is married to Mona Keilhau Storhøi (who also had a small part in The 13th Warrior) and has three children, two from an earlier marriage.

Filmography

References

External links 
 

Living people
1960 births
People from Fredrikstad
Norwegian male film actors
Norwegian male stage actors
Norwegian male television actors
Norwegian male voice actors